Akshu Fernando (full name Merennage Akshu Prihan Fernando; born 11 March 1991) is a Sri Lankan cricketer. He is a right-handed batsman and right-arm off-break bowler who plays for Panadura Sports Club. He was born in Panadura.

Fernando made his cricketing debut in the 2008 Under-23 Tournament for Panadura, and also played in the 2009 competition.

Fernando's List A debut came in the 2009-10 Premier Limited Overs Tournament competition, against Sri Lanka Air Force, scoring 5 runs. He has featured in 39 first-class cricket matches representing Panadura and Ragama CC.

Accident 
On 28 December 2018, Akshu Fernando was critically injured and has been admitted in the hospital after being hit by a train following training session with his teammates at Mount Lavinia. The incident happened when he had attempted to cross the railway track from the opposite direction after the first train passed by on the parallel track.

See also
 List of Chilaw Marians Cricket Club players

References

External links
 Askhu Fernando at Cricket Archive

1991 births
Living people
Sri Lankan cricketers
Chilaw Marians Cricket Club cricketers
Panadura Sports Club cricketers
Mannar District cricketers